The Château de Sigy-le-Châtel is a ruined castle in the commune of Sigy-le-Châtel in the Saône-et-Loire département of France.

Description 
The castle was built on a rocky outcrop dominating a pass.

It is one of the oldest castles in Mâconnais. It consisted of a large irregularly shaped enceinte made of thick curtain walls. The entrance, to the north towards the plateau, was flanked by two fortified semicircular towers.

The only remains are some stretches of wall, the bases of two large circular towers pierced by cannon positions and, at the western end, the corner of a brick building with a bartizan.

The castle is privately owned and not open to the public.

History 

Origins
 10th century : earliest record of the castle
House of Luzy
 1203: Renaud de Luzy was seigneur
 12th century : reconstruction undertaken
House of Sauzet
 1266: Archambaud de Sauzet, seigneur de Chanay was the husband of Sybille de Luzy, dame de Sigy
 End of 13th century: Humbert de Sauzet, son of the preceding, succeeded them
 1314: Alix, widow or sister of the preceding, became dame de Sigy
House of Marzé
 1361: Jean de Marzé was seigneur
House of Trezettes
 1373: Hugues de Trezettes was the husband of Guillemette de Marzé
House of La Guiche
 1560: Philibert de La Guiche was seigneur
House of Valois-Angoulême
 1629: Marie-Henriette de La Guiche, daughter of the preceding, married Louis-Emmanuel d'Angoulême, grandson of King Charles IX; the fortress was then abandoned and returned, by successions, to the La Guiche family
 1794: Amable-Charles, marquis de La Guiche, last seigneur of Sigy, guillotined

Other arms 
 Luzy: De gueules au chevron d'argent, accompagné de trois étoiles d'or, 2 en chef et 1 en pointe

Bibliography 
 F. Perraud, Le Mâconnais Historique, (1921)

See also 
 List of castles in France

References

Saône-et-Loire
Ruined castles in Bourgogne-Franche-Comté